Yu or Ju (Ю ю; italics: Ю ю) is a letter of the Cyrillic script used in East Slavic and Bulgarian alphabets.

In turn,  is used, where is available, in transcriptions of English letter  (in open syllables), and also of the  digraph.

Pronunciation
After a consonant, no distinct  sound is pronounced, but the consonant is softened. Before a hard consonant or at the end of a word, the result is a back vowel , as in "new".

History
Apart from the form I-O, in early Slavonic manuscripts the letter appears also in a mirrored form O-I. It is the latter form that is probably the original, precisely displaying the Greek combination omicron-iota (οι). At the time that the Greek alphabet was adapted to the Slavonic language giving rise to the Cyrillic alphabet, it denoted the close front rounded vowel  in educated Greek speech. The close front rounded vowel does not appear in East Slavic. See above.

There was another way for it to lead to the modern form. By the analogy to several 'iotated' letters Ѥ, ІА, Ѩ and Ѭ, the ancient ligature (or letter) Uk / possibly had its iotated form /.

Related letters and other similar characters
У у : Cyrillic letter U
Ү ү : Cyrillic letter Ue
Û û : Latin letter U with circumflex
Ū ū : Latin letter U with macron
Ǔ ǔ : Latin letter U with caron

Computing codes

References

External links

Vowel letters
Cyrillic ligatures